Sarati the Terrible may refer to:

 Sarati the Terrible (1937 film), a French drama film
 Sarati the Terrible (1923 film), a French silent film